The 2015–16 ISU Short Track Speed Skating World Cup was a multi-race tournament over a season for short track speed skating. The season began on 30 October 2015 in Canada and ended on 14 February 2016. The World Cup was organised by the ISU who also ran world cups and championships in speed skating and figure skating. Toronto hosted a world cup competition for the first time ever.

Calendar

Men

Montreal 30 October – 1 November 2015

Toronto 6–8 November 2015

Nagoya 4–6 December 2015

Shanghai 11–13 December 2015

Dresden 5–7 February 2016

Dordrecht 12–14 February 2016

Women

Montreal 30 October – 1 November 2015

Toronto 6–8 November 2015

Nagoya 4–6 December 2015

Shanghai 11–13 December 2015

Dresden 5–7 February 2016

Dordrecht 12–14 February 2016

World Cup standings

See also
 2016 World Short Track Speed Skating Championships

Notes

References

External links 
 ISU.org World Cup Schedule
 Official results

ISU Short Track Speed Skating World Cup
Isu Short Track Speed Skating World Cup, 2015-16
Isu Short Track Speed Skating World Cup, 2015-16
International sports competitions in Toronto